Florian Jarjat (born 18 February 1980) is a French former professional footballer who played as a left defender. He is responsible for the youth sector of FC Métropole Troyenne.

Career
Jarjat played for SC Bastia too. On 15 July 2009, FC Nantes signed the former Dijon FCO left-back on a free transfer and on a one-year deal. After just one season the 30-year-old defender left Nantes to sign a three-year deal with ES Troyes.

Coaching career
Jarjat was named manager of FCA Troyes for the 2016/17 season.

In the summer 2019, the two clubs Football Club de l'Agglomération Troyennes (FCAT) and  Aube Sud Vanne Pays d'Othe (ASVPO) was dissolved, and Football club de la métropole troyenne (FCMT) was born. Jarjat was hired as responsible for the youth sector for FCMT.

References

External links
 
 

1980 births
Living people
Sportspeople from Valence, Drôme
Footballers from Auvergne-Rhône-Alpes
French footballers
ASOA Valence players
SC Bastia players
Dijon FCO players
Association football defenders
OGC Nice players
FC Nantes players
ES Troyes AC players
Ligue 1 players
Ligue 2 players